American heavy metal band Static-X has released seven studio albums, one live album, one compilation album, one video album, one extended play, nineteen singles, three promotional singles and nineteen music videos.

Albums

Studio albums

Live albums

Compilation albums

Video albums

Extended plays

Singles

Promotional singles

Soundtrack appearances

Music videos

References

External links
Static-X at AllMusic

Heavy metal group discographies
Discographies of American artists
Discography